Anupam Sanklecha (born 17 July 1982) is an Indian first-class cricketer who plays for Maharashtra.

References

External links
 

1982 births
Living people
Indian cricketers
Maharashtra cricketers
People from Ahmednagar
Mumbai Champs cricketers